Tam Laird is the current Leader of the Scottish Libertarian Party; he is a Founding member of the party, and previously served as Deputy Leader of the Scottish Libertarians. Laird was an infantry soldier in the British Army, with which he served five years in Northern Ireland. Originally a member of the Scottish National Party (SNP), (which he has been highly critical of), Laird is a life-long supporter of Scottish Independence, a position endorsed by the Scottish Libertarian Party. His departure from the SNP was spurred on by what he saw as a change in emphasis within the party platform; from a focus on Scottish Nationalism, to a more conventional left-wing position. Tam has  been a strong critic of Scotland's pandemic restrictions, and has taken a monarchist and anti-abortion position on other debates within libertarianism.
Laird has described an early association with hard right politics, which he had become disillusioned with by his late 20s. Laird is a regular contributor to the Scottish Liberty Podcast.

In 2016 Laird failed to win a parliamentary seat in Edinburgh Central. Laird also attempted to win election in a 2019 Edinburgh council by-election.

In the 2021 Scottish Parliament election, Laird stood again as the Scottish Libertarian candidate for Edinburgh Central, as well as a regional list candidate on the Lothian Region; he was unsuccessful in getting elected, gaining only 137 votes and 0.3% of the vote for the constituency, while the party gained 689 votes and 0.2% of the vote on the regional list.

References

Scottish libertarians
Year of birth missing (living people)
Living people